G. Keith Bryant (born 1959) is an American firefighter and the current head of the US Fire Administration.

Career

Bryant was a firefighter starting in 1977 before becoming the fire chief of Oklahoma City from 2005 to 2017. He was also the president of the International Association of Fire Chiefs. In May 2017, President Donald Trump announced his intention to nominate Bryant as Administrator of the United States Fire Administration (USFA).

References

American fire chiefs
American firefighters
People from Oklahoma City
1960 births
Living people
Trump administration personnel